Akköprü Dam is an embankment dam on the Dalaman River in Muğla Province, Turkey, built between 1995 and 2009.

See also

List of dams and reservoirs in Turkey

External links
DSI

Dams in Muğla Province
Hydroelectric power stations in Turkey
Dams completed in 2009